{{Infobox Football club season
| club               = FC Zenit Saint Petersburg
| image              = 
| caption            = 
| season             = 2002
| manager            = Yury Morozov  Mikhail Biryukov  Boris Rappoport
| chairman           = 
| stadium            = Petrovsky Stadium
| league             = 
| league result      = 
| cup1               = 
| cup1 result        = 
| cup2               = 
| cup2 result        = {{nowrap|Round of 16 vs Lada-Tolyatti}}
| cup3               = 
| cup3 result        = 
| league topscorer   = Aleksandr Kerzhakov (14)
| season topscorer   = Aleksandr Kerzhakov (16)
| highest attendance = 
| lowest attendance  = 
| average attendance = 
| prevseason         = 2001
| nextseason         = 2003
}}
The 2002 Zenit St.Petersburg season' was the club's eighth season in the Russian Premier League, the highest tier of association football in Russia.

Squad

Transfers

In

Out

Competitions
Overall record

Premier League

Results by round

Results

League table

Russian Cup
2001/02

2002/03

UEFA Cup

Squad statistics

Appearances and goals

|-
|colspan="14"|Players who left Zenit during the season:''

|}

Goal scorers

Clean sheets

Disciplinary record

References

External links
  
  

Zenit Saint Petersburg
2002